The 1845 Texas gubernatorial election was held on December 15, 1845, to elect the first governor of Texas. The election was held in preparation for the annexation of Texas by the United States and resulted in the election of James Pinckney Henderson, who received 82% of the vote and became the first governor of the new state.

Results

See also
1844 Republic of Texas presidential election, the last presidential election in the Republic of Texas

References

Gubernatorial
1845
1845 United States gubernatorial elections
December 1845 events